Masada is a studio album by Ivory Coast reggae artist Alpha Blondy, with The Solar System. It was released in 1992 on World Pacific.

The album was very popular in France, where it went double gold.

Critical reception
The Washington Post wrote that the album "offers an invariably melodic mix of romantic Afro-pop ('Rendezvous'), spiritual things ('God Is One') and political anthems ('Peace in Liberia'), all fashionably arranged to suit Blondy's yearning tenor."

Track listing

All songs are backed by The Solar System.

Personnel
Arranged By – Alpha Blondy, Boncana Maiga
Backing Vocals – Colau Van Montagu, Corine Van Montagu, Marylou Seba 
Bass Guitar – Abou Bbass Ae
Electronic Drums, Keyboards – Romie (Ibis) Lawrence
Engineer (Assistant Prise De Son) – Philippe Gassert 
Engineer [Prise De Son] – Dennis-Bovel, Laurent Patte 
Keyboards [Akai 1100] – Michel Lorents
Lead Vocals – Alpha Blondy 
Mixed By – Dennis-Bovel
Mixed By (Assistant De Mixage) – Laurent Patte 
Percussion – Clayton Joseph, Max Facon
Percussion (Tama) – Bou N'Diaye (tracks: 2) 
Percussion (Zarb) – Pierre Rigopoulos (tracks: 6) 
Photography By – Pierre Terrasson 
Rhythm Guitar – Afriloue Eugène, Christian Poloni
Soloist, Guitar – Christian Poloni
Soloist, Saxophone – Alan Hoist
Strings – Kouznetzof Alain, Gaunet Jean, Michel Cron 
Tenor Saxophone – Hatot Alain 
Trombone – Bolognesi Jacques
Trumpet – Philippe Slominski

References

1992 albums
Alpha Blondy albums